The 16th Golden Horse Awards (Mandarin:第16屆金馬獎) took place on November 2, 1979, at Sun Yat-sen Memorial Hall in Taipei, Taiwan.

Winners and nominees 
Winners are listed first, highlighted in boldface.

References

16th
1979 film awards
1979 in Taiwan